The Ontario Junior B Lacrosse League (OJBLL) is a box lacrosse league sanctioned by the Ontario Lacrosse Association in Canada.  The league features twenty-five teams in Ontario, one in Quebec, and one in the Akwesasne (which straddles the two aforementioned provinces and New York) that annually play a 20-game schedule and four rounds of playoffs for the J. A. MacDonald Trophy. After the conclusion of the playoffs, a league champion represents the OJBLL at the Founders Cup National Junior B Championship.

History

The Ontario Junior B Lacrosse League of the Ontario Lacrosse Association has been around since at least 1965. The OJBLL compete for the J. A. MacDonald Trophy annually at the provincial level. At the national level, the OJBLL has been extremely dominant at the Founders Cup tournament only losing out to other leagues a handful of times in the last 40+ years.

Players from the OJBLL and the Ontario Junior A Lacrosse League are often drafted straight into the professional levels of lacrosse, the National Lacrosse League and Canadian Lacrosse League.

The league has changed formats few times in the last few decades. The league has played with no divisions (1990) and with as many as seven (2005). In the past few years, the league has expanded to Oakville, Windsor, London, Cornwall, Hamilton, Niagara, Markham, Orangeville, and Welland. Also, for the 2007 season, the City of Caledon applied to resurrect its old Caledon Bandits franchise, but was offered a spot in the new OLA Junior C Lacrosse League in 2008. Kahnawake Hunters joined the OLA Junior B League in 2009 after not fielding a team in the OLA or Iroquois League for five years. In 2012, the Brampton Excelsiors joined the OJBLL.

Clarington Green Gaels had a run between 1998 and 2004 when the Gaels won four Founders Cups Canadian Junior B titles and two J. A. MacDonald Trophy championships. Of the more recent expansion of the league, the Oakville Buzz have been the most remarkable franchise to be built. In 2006, the Buzz team went 19-1 and strolled through the playoffs with little opposition. The Buzz went undefeated at the Founders Cup and crushed the hopes of the host Windsor AKO Fratmen, beating them by a score of 10-4 in the final. Oakville made the jump to Junior A for the 2019 season.

Six Nations Rebels dominated the league from 2007 through 2014, winning five league championships (2007, 2008, 2011, 2012, 2013) and six Founders Cups (2007, 2008, 2011, 2012, 2013, and 2014).

Orangeville continued the league success at Founders Cup winning back-to-back titles in 2016 and 2017. Elora Mohawks kept the OJBLL streak alive when they captured gold at the 2018 national championship. It would mark the sixth gold medal in the history of the Mohawks.

Teams

Champions
Overall champions are bolded. In three-division years, the italics denote finals runner-up. Champion moves on to the Founders Cup national championship.

(*) denotes that OLA championship was awarded through a superior record at Founders Cup/Castrol Cup tournament.

Former teams

Barrie Tornado (Relocated to Orillia in 2009 in return getting Orillia Junior A franchise in Barrie)
Brantford Posse (Folded after 2002 season)
Huntsville Hawks (Moved to Junior C in 2011)
Kitchener-Waterloo Braves (Moved to Junior A in 1991)
Mimico Mountaineers (Mississauga Junior A moved to Mimico in 2015 folding Mimico Junior B)
Mississauga Tomahawks (Moved to Junior A in 1988)
Oakville Buzz (Moved to Junior A in 2019)
Onondaga Redhawks (Folded after 2003 season)
Orangeville Northmen (Moved to Junior A in 1991)
Six Nations Arrows (Moved to Junior A in 1990)
Toronto Beaches (Folded after 1983 season)
Windsor Warlocks (Folded after 1985 season)

References

External links
OJBLL website
The Bible of Lacrosse

Ontario Lacrosse Association
Lacrosse leagues in Canada
Sports leagues established in 1965
1965 establishments in Ontario